Dorrie K. Fontaine is an American educator, author, dean, and critical care nurse. She is known best for her academic leadership at the University of Virginia School of Nursing.

Biography 
Fontaine was born and raised in Charlottesville. She earned a bachelor's degree in nursing from Villanova University in 1972, a master's degree from the University of Maryland in 1977, and subsequently began her career in academia before receiving a PhD from the Catholic University of America.

Fontaine served as the fifth dean of the University of Virginia School of Nursing (UVA) for over a decade before retiring in July 2018. While at UVA, she created the Compassionate Care Initiative to help train nurses on providing empathetic care to patients and implemented requirements of interprofessional education among medical and nursing students through course material and training exercises. Fontaine is a past president and member of the American Association of Critical-Care Nurses and has been a fellow of the American Academy of Nursing for over 20 years.

Bibliography

Awards 

 University of Maryland's Visionary Pioneer Award
 2019 Elizabeth Zintl Leadership Award
 AACN Pioneering Spirit Award
 Presidential Citation from the Society of Critical Care Medicine
 2013 Capstone International Nursing Book Award
 2019 Healthy Work Environment Award

References

External links
 Fontaine, Dorrie • University of Virginia School of Nursing
 Nursing Dean Emerita Dorrie K. Fontaine Chosen for 2019 Zintl Leadership Award
 Dorrie K. Fontaine – Kosmos Journal
 University of Virginia Nursing Dean Emerita Dorrie K. Fontaine selected for 2019 Leadership Award
 Dorrie K. Fontaine | HuffPost
 Dean Dorrie Fontaine | Semester At Sea
 Dorrie K Fontaine's profile on Publons
 Dorrie K. Fontaine (Author of Critical Care Nursing) - Goodreads
 Award Recognizes UVA Nursing Dean Dorrie Fontaine - AACN

American writers
American academic administrators
American nurses
American women nurses
Villanova University alumni
University of Maryland, College Park alumni
People from Charlottesville, Virginia
Catholic University of America alumni
Year of birth missing (living people)
Living people
21st-century American women